Setia V Residences is a residential complex located at Gurney Drive, a suburb of George Town, Penang, Malaysia. It consists of a pair of skyscrapers, Tower A and Tower B, with 48 and 32 stories respectively.

Units were sold between RM 1.95 million and RM 7.47 million (US$ 465,000 and US$1.79 million) 

The residential complex sits at a   site of the former campus of Tenby School (Sri Inai School), a private school based in Penang, founded in the 1980s.  This site, under the acquirement of S P Setia, a Malaysian property development firm, was redeveloped in 2011. The original campus of Tenby School was subsequently demolished later that year. Both Tower A and B topped out in 2016 while the complex was fully completed in late-2017.

See also 
  List of tallest buildings in George Town
 Gurney Drive

References

External links 
 Setia V Residences

Buildings and structures in George Town, Penang
2017 establishments in Malaysia

Residential skyscrapers in Malaysia
Buildings and structures completed in 2017